Torquigener is a genus of pufferfishes native to the Indian and Pacific oceans. Their name refers to their ability to build circular structures on sandy sea bottom (torquis + gener).

Species
Twenty species are recognized in this genus:
 Torquigener albomaculosus Matsuura, 2014 (white-spotted pufferfish) 
 Torquigener altipinnis J. D. Ogilby, 1891
 Torquigener andersonae Hardy, 1983 (Anderson's toadfish)
 Torquigener balteus Hardy, 1989 (slender blaasop)
 Torquigener brevipinnis Regan, 1903
 Torquigener flavimaculosus Hardy & J. E. Randall, 1983
 Torquigener florealis Cope, 1871
 Torquigener gloerfelti Hardy, 1984
 Torquigener hicksi Hardy, 1983 (Hick's toadfish)
 Torquigener hypselogeneion Bleeker, 1852 (orange-spotted toadfish)
 Torquigener marleyi Fowler, 1929
 Torquigener pallimaculatus Hardy, 1983
 Torquigener parcuspinus Hardy, 1983 (yellow-eyed toadfish)
 Torquigener paxtoni Hardy, 1983
 Torquigener perlevis J. D. Ogilby, 1908 (spineless toadfish)
 Torquigener pleurogramma Regan, 1903 (weeping toadfish)
 Torquigener randalli Hardy, 1983 (Randall's puffer)
 Torquigener squamicauda J. D. Ogilby, 1910 (brush-tail toadfish)
 Torquigener tuberculiferus J. D. Ogilby, 1912
 Torquigener vicinus Whitley, 1930
 Torquigener whitleyi Paradice, 1927 (Whitley's toadfish)

References

 
Tetraodontidae
Marine fish genera
Taxa named by Gilbert Percy Whitley
Taxonomy articles created by Polbot